Byewater Point is the rocky point forming the northwest extremity of Snow Island in the South Shetland Islands, Antarctica. It is a north entrance point for Boyd Strait. Elysian Beach extends 2 km eastwards from the point. The area was visited by 19th century sealers.

The feature was charted and named in 1829 by the British naval expedition under Captain Henry Foster.

Location

Map
 L.L. Ivanov. Antarctica: Livingston Island and Greenwich, Robert, Snow and Smith Islands. Scale 1:120000 topographic map.  Troyan: Manfred Wörner Foundation, 2009.

References
 SCAR Composite Antarctic Gazetteer.

Headlands of the South Shetland Islands